Leutnant Karl Gallwitz (18 August 1895 – 17 May 1984) was a World War I flying ace credited with ten aerial victories.

Early life
Karl Gallwitz was born in Sigmaringen, the German Empire, in 1895. He visited the Gymnasium-school in Nordhausen.

Aerial service

Gallwitz originally flew a Roland D.III for artillery cooperation units on the Russian Front, shooting down two observation balloons with FA 37, before a brief assignment to Jasta 29. On 24 August 1917, he joined Jasta Boelcke in France. He scored three times in October; the last one, on the 27th, was over Arthur Rhys-Davids. He started over again in 1918, scoring five more times, including bringing down British aces Robert Kirby Kirkman and John Herbert Hedley. Gallwitz finished out his tally of ten on 21 April 1918, and crashed soon thereafter. Once he recuperated from his injuries, he was assigned to Inspekteur der Flieger.

Postwar
From 1919 he studied Mechanical engineering in Braunschweig, Danzig and Stuttgart.

He later was a professor for agricultural machinery at the university of Göttingen, where he taught from 1936 to 1965.

Sources of information

References
 Above the Lines: The Aces and Fighter Units of the German Air Service, Naval Air Service and Flanders Marine Corps 1914 - 1918 Norman L. R. Franks, et al. Grub Street, 1993. , .

1895 births
1984 deaths
German World War I flying aces
Prussian Army personnel
People from Sigmaringen
People from the Province of Hohenzollern
Military personnel from Baden-Württemberg
Recipients of the Iron Cross (1914), 1st class
Academic staff of the University of Göttingen